John Monro may refer to:

 John Monro (advocate) (1725–1773), Scottish advocate
 John Monro (physician) (1716–1791), physician and specialist in insanity
 John Monro (surgeon) (1670–1740), Scottish surgeon
John U. Monro (1912–2002), American academic administrator

See also
 Charles John Monro, credited with bringing rugby union to New Zealand
 Monro of Fyrish
 John Monroe (disambiguation)
 John Munro (disambiguation)